The 1992 Weber State Wildcats football team represented Weber State University as a member of the Big Sky Conference during the 1992 NCAA Division I-AA football season. Led by fourth-year head coach Dave Arslanian and senior quarterback Jamie Martin, the Wildcats compiled and overall record of 6–5 with a mark of 4–3 in conference play, tying for third place in the Big Sky. In 2014, Martin's number 10 was the first number be retired in Stewart Stadium. As of 2019, Martin is the only Weber State player to receive this honor.

Schedule

Team players in the NFL
No Weber State players were selected in the 1993 NFL Draft.

The following finished their college career in 1992, were not drafted, but played in the NFL.

References

Weber State
Weber State Wildcats football seasons
Weber State Wildcats football